Akin Akinsehinde (born 14 April 1976) is a Nigerian footballer forward.

Akinsehinde won the 1991–92 Nigeria FA Cup with El-Kanemi Warriors F.C. He also played club football abroad with SK Rapid Wien, First Vienna FC, Akhaa Ahli Aley FC and Zamalek SC.

He appeared for Nigeria in 1993.

References

1976 births
Living people
Nigerian footballers
Yoruba sportspeople
Sur SC players
Expatriate footballers in Oman
Nigerian expatriate sportspeople in Oman
Nigerian expatriate footballers
Nigeria international footballers
Association football forwards